Jim Petty is an American politician. He serves in the Arkansas Senate representing the 29th district.

Life and career 
Petty was a businessperson. He was also a member of the Van Buren City Council.

In May 2022, Petty defeated Warren Robertson in the Republican primary election for the 29th district of the Arkansas Senate. No candidate was nominated to challenge him in the general election. He succeeded Ricky Hill.

References 

Living people
Place of birth missing (living people)
Year of birth missing (living people)
Republican Party Arkansas state senators
21st-century American politicians